Ovruch is a city in Korosten Raion, in the Zhytomyr Oblast (province) of northern Ukraine. Prior to 2020, it was the administrative center of the former Ovruch Raion (district).

Geography
Located in northwestern Ukraine, 50 km south of the Belarusian border, Ovruch is part of the geographical region of Polesia. It's located 48 km (30 miles) from Korosten, 133 km from Zhytomyr, and 92 km from Mazyr, in Belarus; and it is 100 km from the ghost town of Pripyat, near the Chernobyl Nuclear Power Plant.

History

Ovruch originated as an important town of Kyivan Rus, first mentioned as Vruchiy in 977. Later after the sack of Iskorosten it became the capital city of Drevlian. Saint Hyacinth of Poland evangelized in the town between 1222 and 1234. The area suffered during the Mongol invasion in 1240, and then it passed under Mongol suzerainty. In the 14th century it became part of the Grand Duchy of Lithuania. It became one of many Lithuanian defensive strongholds in the region against possible Tatar invasions. In 1483, Crimean Tatars destroyed the settlement. From the 16th century the town was governed by starosts, and it flourished and became a subregional center.

According to the Treaty of Lublin (1569), Owrucz passed to Poland within the Polish–Lithuanian Commonwealth. The town further blossomed as the seat of county sejmiks. From 1614 until his death in 1616, the starost of Owrucz was Michał Wiśniowiecki, grandfather of future Polish King Michał Korybut Wiśniowiecki. A Dominican Monastery was founded, confirmed by Bishop Aleksander Sokołowski in 1638. In 1641, Polish King Władysław IV Vasa granted Owrucz city rights. It was a royal city of Poland. After the Second Partition of Poland in 1793 it was annexed by the Russian Empire. In 1881, it had a population of 5,941.

During World War II, the German occupiers operated a Jewish forced labour battalion in the town.

Architecture

The only mark of the town's antiquity is St. Basil's Church, commissioned by Rurik II of Kyiv from his court architect Pyotr Miloneg in the late 1190s. The church was built in Rurik's votchina and was dedicated to his patron saint.

St. Basil's Church has four pillars, three apses and one dome. The western facade is flanked by two round towers, probably in imitation of the Saint Sophia Cathedral in Kyiv. The building is distinguished by elaborate brick facades, interlaced with bands of polished colored stone. The complicated design of pilasters points to a complex system of roofing and to a very high dome. The dome and vaults collapsed during the siege of Ovruch by Gediminas in 1321. The ruins of the church survived until 1842, when they crumbled, with the exception of three apses and a portion of the northern wall with an arch.

In 1907 Aleksey Shchusev was commissioned to restore the church to its presumed original form, incorporating the remains of Rurik's church into its edifice. Restoration work lasted for two years, and it won Schusev the prestigious title of the Academician of Architecture. More recently, the accuracy of his restoration has been questioned, as it didn't take into account the complicated system of vaulting and the considerable height of the drum. As a consequence of this oversight, the drum was restored according to a model typical of more archaic churches, rather than for the turn of the 13th century. Adjacent buildings of St. Basil's Convent were built on the model of medieval architecture of Pskov, simultaneously with the restoration of the main church.

Climate

Personalities
Vladimir Bogoraz (1865-1936), revolutionary, writer and anthropologist
Stefano Ittar (1724-1790), Polish-Italian architect
Oleksandr Lavrynovych (b. 1956), physicist, lawyer and politician
Yuri Nemyrych (1612–1659), politician of the Polish–Lithuanian Commonwealth

Gallery

See also
Chernihiv–Ovruch railway

References

Памятники градостроительства и архитектуры Украинской ССР. Kiev, 1983–86. Vol. 2, page 153 (online)

External links

 Ovruch official website
 Photos of Ovruch
 Ovruch @ Ukrainian.Travel

Cities in Zhytomyr Oblast
Korosten Raion
Ovruchsky Uyezd
Cossack Hetmanate
Kiev Voivodeship
Drevlians
Cities of district significance in Ukraine
Rus' settlements